Pronto, stylized as PRONTO, is the second-generation contactless payment system for automated fare collection on public transit services in San Diego County, California. The system is managed by the San Diego Association of Governments, operated by INIT Systems, and is valid on all services operated by the Metropolitan Transit System, and on North County Transit District. It launched on September 1, 2021, replacing the first-generation Compass Card system. Pronto involved the installation of new fare machines at all transit stations. It was the first contactless smart card introduction in California during the COVID-19 pandemic.

History

Planning and Installation
In 2018, the San Diego Metropolitan Transit System launched Elevate San Diego, a public participation plan that will address the needs for the growing population, and eventually invoke Assembly Bill 805, and increase the half-cent sales tax within MTS jurisdiction via ballot proposition. It has been postponed indefinitely due to the pandemic. 

In January 2019, MTS awarded INIT Systems the contract to install and operate the new system.

Installation began in February 2021 on MTS vehicles. The first machine was installed at the San Diego Convention Center on February 8, with further machines and validators being installed at NCTD and MTS transit stations in the following months.

Transition
On April 16, 2021, the SANDAG Transportation Committee voted to approve the system. On June 17, the MTS Board adopted a transition plan, and announced the system will launch on September 1, when proposed fare hikes take effect. 

The transition began in August 2021, when cards became available for purchase.  On August 15, registration began, and the app was released to smartphones. The system came online at midnight on September 1. Cards issued during the transition period were pre-loaded with a monthly pass, which activated upon launch of the system.

As the primary agency of the system, MTS assumed user support responsibilities, including the chat and call centers, which are called the Pronto Support Team.

Technology
The system is account-based, rather than the previous card-based Compass Card. Once purchasing a smart card or creating an account on the app, an account will be tied to it. All cards have the same design, with the exclusion of Pronto ID cards; however, cardholders entitled to discounted fares have the opportunity to change the type of account their card is tied to by contacting support. 

The technology uses a "Best Fare" principle. The card is tapped only at the beginning of all non-Coaster trips to deduct a one-way fare. Non-transfer one-way fares will be deducted each time the card is used until reaching the daily or monthly cap, which equals the same price as it would take to purchase a day or month unlimited ridership pass. Therefore, riders pay as they go until reaching the price of such a pass. The Pronto card restored the ability to pay for just a single one-way fare if transferring to other services within two hours of tapping the card initially. The ability to purchase unlimited ride passes is retained. 

As different rules apply, route-specific eTickets will be available for NCTD's Coaster route. The new system also features smartphone app capability for devices with 4G and 5G technology. A person may register multiple cards under one account for groups and families. 

The cards feature the MIFARE DESFire semiconductor, while the app is written in INIT's MOBILEVario platform.

Photo gallery

Works Cited

External Links
Official Pronto Site

2021 introductions
Contactless smart cards
Fare collection systems in the United States
Transportation in San Diego
San Diego Metropolitan Transit System
North County Transit District